Stenomacra is a genus of bordered plant bugs in the family Largidae. There are at least eight described species in Stenomacra.

Species
 Stenomacra atra (Brailovsky and Mayorga, 1997)
 Stenomacra dissimilis (Distant, 1883)
 Stenomacra limbatipennis (HStål, 1860)
 Stenomacra magna (Brailovsky and Mayorga, 1997)
 Stenomacra marginella (Herrich-Schaeffer, 1850)
 Stenomacra scapha (Perty, 1833)
 Stenomacra tungurahuana (Brailovsky and Mayorga, 1997)
 Stenomacra turrialbana (Brailovsky and Mayorga, 1997)

References

Further reading

 
 
 

Largidae